Wayne Delbert Anderson (December 10, 1930 – January 16, 2013) was an American college basketball coach, the head coach for eight seasons at the University of Idaho, his alma mater.  He was also the head baseball coach at Idaho for nine seasons, and the assistant athletic director for fifteen

Playing career

Anderson was the starting quarterback and nationally ranked punter on the football team and a pitcher on the baseball team (and also played basketball as a freshman). He was a member of Delta Chi fraternity, and was elected class president as a senior.

Coaching
Following graduation in 1953, Anderson coached a year in Roseburg, Oregon, and then served two years in the  He returned to the university in 1956 to run its intramural program and work on his master's degree.  In the summer of 1957, Anderson was promoted to assistant coach in basketball and football, and became the head baseball coach for the 1958 season, switching positions with

Baseball
The baseball team won the inaugural Big Sky title in 1964, and again in 1966, led by starting pitchers Bill Stoneman and Frank Reberger. The 1966 team was 31–7 in the regular season and made the NCAA tournament for the first time; the Vandals eliminated Colorado State College and Air Force with three straight victories the road in Greeley, Colorado.

Basketball
That September, Anderson was promoted to head coach in basketball, and stopped coaching baseball. While head baseball coach, he had been an assistant in basketball for eight years under the previous four head coaches. In his second season in 1968, he was named conference coach of the year. In 1971, he took on additional duties as assistant athletic director. After his eighth season as head basketball coach, Anderson resigned both positions in March 1974 and stopped coaching at age 43. He returned to the university in 1982 as the assistant athletic director, and stayed for another dozen years, retiring in December 1994.

Anderson was inducted into the Idaho Athletic Hall of Fame and the University of Idaho's Athletic Hall of Fame.

Death
After a battle with cancer, Anderson died at age 82 at St. Joseph Regional Medical Center in Lewiston in early 2013.

Head coaching record

Basketball

References

External links
 Go Vandals.com – athletics – Hall of Fame – Wayne Anderson (with video interview)

1930 births
2013 deaths
Basketball coaches from Washington (state)
Baseball players from Spokane, Washington
Basketball players from Spokane, Washington
College men's basketball head coaches in the United States
Idaho Vandals baseball coaches
Idaho Vandals baseball players
Idaho Vandals football coaches
Idaho Vandals football players
Idaho Vandals men's basketball coaches
Idaho Vandals men's basketball players
Players of American football from Spokane, Washington
American men's basketball players